Gato Loco is a New York City based band formed in 2006 by Stefan Zeniuk & formerly produced/conducted by Clifton Hyde. Gato Loco CocoNino has been positively reviewed by the press. The band was interviewed in 2011 by Radio France while on their European tour.

Current personnel
Stefan Zeniuk: tenor/bass saxophones, bass clarinet
Tim Vaughn: trombone
"Tuba" Joe Exley: tuba 
Ari Folman-Cohen: bass

References

http://search2.downtownmusicgallery.com/lookup.cgi?item=2009_04_30_20_10_03
http://www.lemonde.fr/cgi-bin/ACHATS/acheter.cgi?offre=ARCHIVES&type_item=ART_ARCH_30J&objet_id=1128454&clef=ARC-TRK-D_01
http://lucidculture.wordpress.com/2008/07/08/gato-loco-at-barbes-brooklyn-ny-7708/

Musical groups from New York City